Mike Nofs (born November 19, 1953) is a Republican politician from Michigan who served in the Michigan Senate from 2009 until 2018 for the 19th district. Nods previously served three terms in the Michigan House of Representatives. He was elected to the Senate in a special election after Mark Schauer resigned upon his election to the United States House of Representatives in 2008 (incidentally, Nofs had succeeded Schauer in the State House when the latter was term-limited out of that chamber).

Prior to his election to the Legislature, Nofs had a career in law enforcement, including as post commander of the Battle Creek Post for the Michigan State Police. He also served for ten years on the Calhoun County Board of Commissioners, including five years as chairman.

References

1953 births
Living people
Republican Party members of the Michigan House of Representatives
Republican Party Michigan state senators
People from Eaton Rapids, Michigan
People from Battle Creek, Michigan
American state police officers
County commissioners in Michigan
Spring Arbor University alumni
21st-century American politicians